Spacebomb Records is an independent record label based in Richmond, Virginia, co-founded by Matthew E. White in 2012. The label has released notable albums by Matthew E. White, Natalie Prass, and Bedouine. The label's first release, White's own Big Inner, garnered widespread attention and propelled the label to international recognition.

Artists

Discography

References 

American independent record labels
Record labels established in 2012
Companies based in Richmond, Virginia
2012 establishments in Virginia